Harikrishan  Goswami (born 24 July 1937), better known by his screen name Manoj Kumar, is an Indian actor, film director, screenwriter, lyricist and editor who worked in Hindi cinema. He  is known for acting and making films with patriotic themes, and has been given the nickname Bharat Kumar. He is the recipient of a National Film Award and seven Filmfare Awards, in varied categories. He was awarded Padma Shri in 1992 and Dadasaheb Phalke Award in 2016 by the Government of India for his contribution to Indian cinema and arts.

His notable works include Shaheed (1965), Upkar (1967) Roti Kapda Aur Makaan (1974), Sanyasi (1975), Dus Numbri (1976) and Kranti (1981); all of them directed by Kumar himself.

Early life 

Kumar was born into a Hindu Brahmin family Abbottabad, a town in the North-West Frontier Province, British India (present-day Khyber Pakhtunkhwa, Pakistan). His original birth name was Harikrishan Giri Goswami. When he was 10, his family had to migrate from Jandiala Sher Khan to Delhi due to the Partition

Career
When he was young, he admired actors Dilip Kumar, Ashok Kumar and Kamini Kaushal and decided to name himself Manoj Kumar, after Dilip Kumar's character in Shabnam.

After making a little-noticed début in Fashion in 1957, Kumar landed his first leading role in Kaanch Ki Gudia (1960) opposite Saida Khan. Piya Milan Ki Aas and Reshmi Roomal followed, setting the stage for the Vijay Bhatt-directed Hariyali Aur Raasta (1962) opposite Mala Sinha. Kumar then appeared with Sadhana in Raj Khosla's Woh Kaun Thi (1964), and reunited with Vijay Bhatt and Mala Sinha in Himalaya Ki God Mein (1965). Kumar and Raj Khosla repeated their successful actor-director partnership with the film Do Badan, which was remembered for many reasons, including Raj Khosla's direction, Kumar and the heroine Asha Parekh's performance and songs written by the lyricist Shakeel Badayuni, among others.

Film work
In the 1960s his successful films included romantic films like Honeymoon, Apna Banake Dekho, Naqli Nawab, Paththar Ke Sanam, Sajan and Sawan Ki Ghata and social films such as Shaadi, Grihasti, Apne Huye Paraye, and Aadmi and thrillers such as Gumnaam, Anita, and Woh Kaun Thi and comedy film like Picnic.

Kumar's starred in the 1965 film Shaheed, based on the life of Bhagat Singh, the Independence revolutionary. After the Indo-Pakistani War of 1965, Prime Minister Lal Bahadur Shastri asked him to create a film based on the popular slogan Jai Jawan Jai Kissan (hail the soldier, hail the farmer).

The result was Kumar's directorial debut Upkaar (1967). In this award-winning film, he played both a soldier and a farmer. The film was also noted for the song "Mere Desh Ki Dharti", written by Gulshan Bawra, composed by Kalyanji-Anandji and sung by Mahendra Kapoor. Upkaar won him his first Filmfare Best Director Award.

He returned to patriotic themes in Purab Aur Paschim (1970), in which life in the East and West are juxtaposed. The film Pehchaan directed by Sohanlal Kanwar had Kumar opposite Babita and was successful.

In 1972, he starred in Be-Imaan (for which he won the Best Actor) and later directed and starred in Shor (1972). The latter, opposite Nanda, was not a huge box office success on its release, but has gained cult status over the years. It featured the memorable song "Ek Pyar Ka Nagma Hai", a duet by Lata Mangeshkar and Mukesh, which was composed by Laxmikant-Pyarelal and written by Santosh Anand.

He consistently liked working with actors Prem Nath, Pran, Prem Chopra, Kamini Kaushal and Hema Malini in his career. His closest friends from the industry included Raj Kapoor, Mukesh, Mahendra Kapoor, Dharmendra, Rajendra Kumar, Shashi Kapoor and Rajesh Khanna.

Peak of his career
In the mid-1970s Kumar starred in three hit films; Roti Kapda Aur Makaan (1974) which was a social commentary, featuring an all-star cast including Zeenat Aman, Shashi Kapoor and Amitabh Bachchan.  He won his second Filmfare Award for Best Director for the film Roti Kapda Makan. Sanyasi, a religious-themed comedy, starring Kumar and Hema Malini, was hugely successful. Dus Numbri (1976) also gave Kumar, Pran, Prem Nath and Hema top billing.

In 1981, Kumar reached the peak of his career when he got the opportunity to direct his idol, Dilip Kumar, as well as to star in Kranti, a story about the struggle for Indian independence in the 19th century. Kranti was the last notable successful Hindi film in his career. He also starred in the hit Punjabi film Jat Punjabi.

Later career
After Kranti in 1981, Kumar's career began to decline, when the films he did with him in lead role like Kalyug Aur Ramayan in 1987 and later Clerk in 1989 failed at the box office. In 1989, he cast Pakistani actors Mohammad Ali and Zeba in his film Clerk. He quit acting after his appearance in the 1995 film Maidan-E-Jung. He directed his son, Kunal Goswami, in the 1999 film Jai Hind which had a patriotic theme. The film was a flop and was the last film Kumar worked on.

He was awarded the Filmfare Lifetime Achievement Award in 1999 for a career spanning over 40 years.

His trademark hand-covering-the-face was very popular and continues to be the butt of jokes of latter day stand-up comedians. In 2007, the Shah Rukh Khan film Om Shanti Om featured the lead character pretending to be Manoj Kumar so as to sneak into a movie premiere, by holding his hand over his face. Kumar filed a lawsuit, which was settled out of court.

Politics

Like many other Bollywood stars, Kumar decided to enter politics following his retirement. Before the 2004 general election in India, he officially joined Bharatiya Janta Party.

Filmography

Accolades and honours

Civilian award

National Film Awards

State Honours

Filmfare Awards

BFJA Awards

Other Awards
2007 – Sardar Patel Lifetime Achievement International Award
 2008 – Star Screen Lifetime Achievement Award
 2010 – Lifetime Achievement Award at the 12th Mumbai Film Festival
 2012 – Lifetime Achievement Award at the Apsara Film & Television Producers Guild Award
 2012 – Lifetime Achievement Award at the Nashik International Film Festival
 2012 – Bharat Gaurav Award in New Jersey, United States
 2013 – Lifetime Achievement Award at the Jagran Film Festival
 2019 – Lifetime Achievement Award from Power Brands at BFJA (Bollywood Film Journalists Awards)
 2020 - Kalaimamani

Other honours
 2008 – To honour Manoj Kumar, the Government of Madhya Pradesh decided to institute a Rs 100,000 award in his name. The state government also recommended Kumar's name for Bharat Ratna to the central government.
 2011 – In recognition of the devotion of Manoj Kumar towards Shri Sai Baba, the Shri Saibaba Sansthan Trust in Shirdi renamed "Pimpalwadi Road" in Shirdi as "Manojkumar Goswami Road".

References

Notes

Citations

External links

Manoj Kumar: Bollywood's Own Mr Bharat
Manoj Kumar : Profile, Gallery, Photos, Videos, News

1937 births
Living people
Bengali people
Indian male screenwriters
Hindi-language film directors
Filmfare Awards winners
Filmfare Lifetime Achievement Award winners
Indian male film actors
Male actors in Hindi cinema
People from Abbottabad
Hindu College, Delhi alumni
20th-century Indian male actors
Dadasaheb Phalke Award recipients
20th-century Indian film directors
Recipients of the Padma Shri in arts
Bharatiya Janata Party politicians from Maharashtra